Dehram Rural District is a rural district (dehestan) in Dehram District, Farashband County, Fars Province, Iran. At the 2006 census, its population was 4,630, in 1,078 families.  The rural district has 14 villages.

References 

Rural Districts of Fars Province
Farashband County